On 4 September 2022, a chartered Cessna 551 business jet registered in Austria was scheduled to fly from Jerez, Spain to Cologne, Germany. Early in the flight, after takeoff, the aircraft's pilot notified air traffic control about a cabin pressure malfunction. After the aircraft passed the Iberian Peninsula, no further contact could be established.

The aircraft involved in this accident, registered as OE-FGR, was first flown in 1979.

According to news reports, contact with OE-FGR was lost shortly after takeoff from Jerez. In Euskirchen, the pilot apparently had planned to take over for final approach into Cologne (15:50 UTC). Since the pilot was apparently unconscious, the plane continued in a straight line for the next 1 hour 41 minutes (17:36 UTC) on a course of 54 degrees. The Cessna then started descending and turning to the right on a course of 116 degrees, seemingly headed for an approach at Ventspils International Airport. It is probable that instead the right engine failed and a change of course was initiated. About 3 minutes later (17:39 UTC), the left engine also failed, as OE-FGR continued to fly straight forward at 116 degrees before starting to lose speed and altitude (17:40 UTC), eventually crashing (17:42 UTC) in the Baltic Sea.

History of the flight 
The aircraft, which was approved for operation with one pilot, took off from Jerez in southern Spain. According to reports from Bild, the pilot reported a cabin pressure problem shortly before ATC contact was lost. A second Rafale from Saint-Dizier air base took over the interception. The Cessna was continuously followed by the French Air Force until it reached Cologne, around 15:57 UTC, when the German Air Force took over.

Two German Eurofighter Typhoon jets were scrambled from the Rostock-Laage air base at 16:15 GMT to contact the aircraft crew and were unsuccessful. Shortly after Rügen, the German fighter pilots broke away at 16:50 GMT. The plane entered Swedish airspace, where it flew south of Gotland and on towards the Gulf of Riga.

A Danish  F-16 fighter jet took over the escort of the ghost flight. Later, the Danish Air Force said they could not see anybody in the cockpit after intercepting the plane.

Aircraft 
The aircraft involved in the accident was a 43-year-old Cessna 551 Citation II built in 1979, with manufacturer serial number 551-0021, registered as OE-FGR. The aircraft was powered by two Pratt & Whitney JT15D-4 engines and did not have a flight data recorder.
Since July 2020, it was owned and operated by GG Rent.

Passengers and crew 
Reportedly, four people from Germany were on board: Karl-Peter Griesemann (who has been confirmed as the pilot of the aircraft), his wife Juliane, their daughter Lisa (who also carried a pilot's licence), and her boyfriend Paul. Experts have proposed that the drop in pressure likely caused the pilot and passengers to lose consciousness, as seen in the 1999 South Dakota Learjet crash, the 2000 Australia Beechcraft King Air crash, and the Helios Airways Flight 522.
The aircraft's operator was GG Rent GmbH, based in Bergisch Gladbach, located to the east of Cologne, Germany.

On 6 September, Mayor of Cologne Henriette Reker commented on the Griesemann family's misfortune and offered condolences.

Aftermath 
According to the Latvian Maritime and Air Rescue Centre, parts of the plane have been located. The Swedish Stena Line ferry Stena Urd was asked to help at the crash site.

Swedish and Lithuanian helicopters flew around the crash site for several hours but did not find any survivors or bodies, said Lars Antonsson at the Maritime and Air Rescue Centre. Johan Ahlin from the Swedish Maritime Rescue Agency told SVT that the emergency services discovered traces of oil on the water and smaller pieces of debris.

On 5 September, a total of 11 plane wreckage parts including seats had been found, and shortly before midnight, human remains were found and transported to Ventspils by the Latvian Naval Forces.

On 8 September, further investigation of the accident was taken over by the German Federal Bureau of Aircraft Accident Investigation.

Witnesses 
There are not believed to be any eyewitnesses to the crash, however, numerous observers on the ground saw the aircraft in flight, some capturing video, and more than 300,000 people worldwide witnessed the crash on various online flight tracking services, such as Flightradar24.

Investigation
According to the provisional report, everyone on board the plane, including the pilot Griesemann, became unconscious shortly after asking a Spanish air traffic controller for permission to descend due to problems on board.

The aircraft continued to fly on autopilot until it exhausted all of its fuel and crashed into the Baltic Sea.

See also 
 Notable decompression accidents
 1999 South Dakota Learjet crash

References

2022 in Latvia
2022 disasters in Europe
September 2022 events in Europe
Aviation accidents and incidents in 2022
Aviation accidents and incidents in Latvia
Airliner accidents and incidents caused by fuel exhaustion
Airliner accidents and incidents caused by pilot incapacitation
History of the Baltic Sea